Erik Eriksson Tulindberg (February 22, 1761 – September 1, 1814) was the first known Finnish composer of classical music.

Life

Tulindberg was born in Vähäkyrö in Western Finland. He studied in Turku and then worked as a civil servant in Oulu from 1784 to 1809 and thereafter in Turku. He played the violin and cello and was appointed a member of the Royal Swedish Academy of Music in 1797. He died in Turku at the age of 53.

Music

From his compositions only a violin concerto in B-flat major, six string quartets, and a polonaise with five variations for solo violin remain. He wrote the violin concerto before 1784 during his youth in Turku. The work shows "simplicity and occasional clumsiness" and the influences of Mozart, Haydn and the Mannheim School of music.

His string quartets are more mature works and are better known today than the violin concerto. The string quartets are in the tradition of Haydn. A copy of Haydn's string quartets was found among Tulindberg's possessions after his death.

Perspective

Tulindberg was a contemporary of Mozart and, like Mozart, he was part of the Classical era in music. His importance stems largely from his pioneering position in the music of Finland. No Finnish composer is known from the Renaissance or Baroque eras. The compositions of Tulindberg were not rediscovered until 100 years after his death.

External links
Finnish music information site (in English)
About Tulindberg and the String Quartets, entry on Rantatie Quartet site
Steglein Database entry to the string quartets of Tulindberg
Erik Tulindberg, entry in the German Wikipedia (in German)

1761 births
1814 deaths
People from Vähäkyrö
Swedish-speaking Finns
Classical-period composers
Finnish classical composers
Finnish classical violinists
Male classical violinists
Finnish male classical composers
19th-century male musicians